This page list topics related to Hungary.



0-9

A
Abortion in Hungary
Administrative divisions of Hungary
Architecture of Hungary
Austria-Hungary

B
Budapest

C
Coat of arms of Hungary
Communications in Hungary
Constitution of Hungary
Counties of Hungary
Crime in Hungary
Cuisine of Hungary
Culture of Hungary

D
Demographics of Hungary

E
Economy of Hungary
Education in Hungary
Elections in Hungary
Energy in Hungary

F
Flag of Hungary
Football in Hungary
Foreign relations of Hungary

G
Geography of Hungary
Germans of Hungary

H
Healthcare in Hungary
History of Hungary
Hungarian American
Hungarian diaspora
Hungarian language
Hungarian minority in Romania
Hungarian mythology
Hungarian notation
Hungarian people
Hungarian prehistory
Hungarian Revolution of 1848
Hungarian Soviet Republic
Hungarians in Slovakia
Hungarians in Vojvodina

I
Institute for Social and European Studies
Islam in Hungary

J
Jatari Indian Folk Association

K

L
Law enforcement in Hungary
LGBT rights in Hungary
List of birds of Hungary
List of mammals of Hungary
List of museums in Hungary
List of schools in Hungary
List of wars involving Hungary

M
Military of Hungary
Music of Hungary

N
National symbols of Hungary
Neues Budapester Abendblatt

O
Old Hungarian script
Outline of Hungary
Orders, decorations, and medals of Hungary

P
Politics of Hungary
Public holidays in Hungary

Q

R
Recognition of same-sex unions in Hungary
Regions of Hungary
Religion in Hungary
Roma minority of Hungary

S
Science and technology in Hungary
Sport in Hungary

T
Tourism in Hungary
Transport in Hungary
Treaty of Trianon

U

V
Vadleany
Visa policy of Hungary
Visa requirements for Hungarian citizens

W
Women in Hungary

X

Y

Z

See also
Lists of country-related topics - similar lists for other countries

Lists
List of castles in Hungary - List of national parks of Hungary

Hungary